India is situated north of the equator between 8°4' north (the mainland) to 37°6' north latitude and 68°7' east to 97°25' east longitude.

On the south, India projects into and is bounded by the Indian Ocean—in particular, by the Arabian Sea on the west, the Lakshadweep Sea to the southwest, the Bay of Bengal on the east, and the Indian Ocean proper to the south. The southernmost tip of the Indian mainland (8°4′38″N, 77°31′56″E) is just south of Kanyakumari, while the southernmost point in India is Indira Point on Great Nicobar Island. The northernmost point which is under Indian administration is Indira Col, Siachen Glacier.

The northern frontiers of India are defined largely by the Himalayan mountain range, where the country borders China, Bhutan, and Nepal. Its western border with Pakistan lies in the Karakoram and Western Himalayan ranges, Punjab Plains, the Thar Desert and the Rann of Kutch salt marshes. In the far northeast, the Chin Hills and Kachin Hills, deeply forested mountainous regions, separate India from Burma. On the east, its border with Bangladesh is largely defined by the Khasi Hills and Mizo Hills, and the watershed region of the Indo-Gangetic Plain.

The Ganges is the longest river originating in India. The Ganges–Brahmaputra system occupies most of northern, central, and eastern India, while the Deccan Plateau occupies most of southern India. The climate across India ranges from equatorial in the far south, to alpine and tundra in the upper regions of the Himalayas. Geologically, India lies on the Indian Plate, the northern part of the Indo-Australian Plate.

Geological development

India is situated entirely on the Indian Plate, a major tectonic plate that was formed when it split off from the ancient continent Gondwanaland (ancient landmass, consisting of the southern part of the supercontinent of Pangea). The Indo-Australian plate is subdivided into the Indian and Australian plates. About 90 million years ago, during the late Cretaceous Period, the Indian Plate began moving north at about 15 cm/year (6 in/yr). In 2007, German geologists determined that the Indian Plate was able to move so quickly because it is only half as thick as the other plates which formerly constituted Gondwanaland. The collision with the Eurasian Plate along the modern border between India and Nepal formed the orogenic belt that created the Tibetan Plateau and the Himalayas. , the Indian Plate is moving northeast at 5 cm/yr (2 in/yr), while the Eurasian Plate is moving north at only 2 cm/yr (0.8 in/yr). India is thus referred to as the "fastest continent". This is causing the Eurasian Plate to deform, and the Indian Plate to compress at a rate of 4 cm/yr (1.6 in/yr).

Political geography

India is divided into 28 States (further subdivided into districts) and 8 union territories including the National capital territory (i.e., Delhi).

Its borders with Pakistan and Bangladesh were delineated according to the Radcliffe Line, which was created in 1947 during Partition of India. This border runs along the Indian states and union territories of Ladakh, Jammu and Kashmir, Punjab, Rajasthan, and Gujarat. Both nations delineated a Line of Control (LoC) to serve as the informal boundary between the Indian and Pakistan-administered areas of the Kashmir region. India claims the whole of the former princely state of Jammu and Kashmir, which includes areas now administered by Pakistan and China, which according to India are illegally occupied areas.

India's border with Bangladesh runs . West Bengal, Assam, Meghalaya, Tripura and Mizoram are the states which share the border with Bangladesh. Before 2015, there were 92 enclaves of Bangladesh on Indian soil and 106 enclaves of India were on Bangladeshi soil. These enclaves were eventually exchanged in order to simplify the border. After the exchange, India lost roughly 40 km2 (10,000 acres) to Bangladesh.

The Line of Actual Control (LAC) is the effective border between India and the People's Republic of China. It traverses 4,057 km along the Indian states and union territories of Ladakh, Himachal Pradesh, Uttarakhand, Sikkim and Arunachal Pradesh. The border with Burma (Myanmar) extends up to  along the eastern borders of India's northeastern states viz. Arunachal Pradesh, Nagaland, Manipur and Mizoram. Located amidst the Himalayan range, India's border with Bhutan runs . Sikkim, West Bengal, Assam and Arunachal Pradesh are the states which share the border with Bhutan. The border with Nepal runs  along the foothills of the Himalayas in northern India. Uttarakhand, Uttar Pradesh, Bihar, West Bengal and Sikkim are the states which share the border with Nepal. The Siliguri Corridor, narrowed sharply by the borders of Bhutan, Nepal and Bangladesh, connects peninsular India with the northeastern states.

Physiographic regions

Cratons

Cratons are a specific kind of continental crust made up of a top layer called platform and an older layer called basement. A shield is the part of a craton where basement rock crops out of the ground, and it is relatively the older and more stable section, unaffected by plate tectonics.

The Indian Craton can be divided into five major cratons as such:
 Aravalli Craton (Marwar-Mewar Craton or Western Indian Craton): Covers Rajasthan as well as western and southern Haryana. It comprises Mewar Craton in the east and Marwar Craton in the west. It is limited by the Great Boundary Fault in the east, sandy Thar Desert in the Thar desert in the west, Indo-ganetic alluvium in the north, Son-Narmada-Tapti in the south. It mainly has quartzite, marble, pelite, greywacke and extinct volcanos exposed in Aravalli-Delhi Orogen. Malani Igneous Suite is the largest in India and third largest igneous suite in the world.
 Bundelkand Craton, covers 26,00 km2 in the Bundelkhand region of Uttar Pradesh and Madhya Pradesh and forms the basis of the Malwa Plateau. It is limited by the Aravalli in the west, Narmada river and Satpura range in the south, and Indo-Gantetic alluvium in the north. It is similar to the Aravali Craton, which used to be a single craton before being divided into two with the evolution of Hindoli and Mahakoshal belts at the margins of two cratons.
 Dharwar Craton (Karnataka Craton), 3.4 - 2.6 Ga, granite-greenstone terrain covers the state of Karnataka and parts of eastern and southern Maharashtra state, and forms the basis of the southern end of the Deccan Plateau.  In 1886 it was divided into two tectonic blocks, namely Eastern Dharwar Craton (EDC) and Western Dharwar Craton (WDC).
 Singhbhum Craton, 4,000 km2 area which primarily covers Jharkhand as well as parts of Odisha, northern Andhra Pradesh, northern Telangana and eastern Maharashtra. It is limited by the Chhota Nagpur Plateau to the north, Eastern Ghats to the southeast, Bastar Craton to southwest and alluvium plain to the east.
 Bastar Craton (Bastar-Bhandara Craton), primarily covers Chhattisgarh and forms the basis of the Chhota Nagpur Plateau. It is a remnant of 3.4-3.0 Ga old TTG gneisses of five types. It is subdivided into Kotri-Dongagarh Orogen and the Rest of Bastar Craton. It is limited by three rifts, Godavari rift in southwest, Narmada rift in northwest and Mahanadi rift in northeast.

Regions

India can be divided into six physiographic regions. They are:
 Northern Mountains: Himalayas
 Peninsular Plateau: contains mountain ranges (Aravalli, Vindhayachal and Satpura ranges), ghats (Eastern Ghats and Western Ghats) and plateaues (Malwa Plateau, Chhota Nagpur Plateau, Southern Garanulite terrain, Deccan Plateau and Kutch Kathiawar plateau).
Indo-Gangetic Plain or The Northern Plains 
Thar Desert
 Coastal Plains: Eastern Ghat folds and Western Ghats folds
 Islands- The Andaman and Nicobar islands and the Lakshadweep islands.

The Himalayas
 
An arc of mountains consisting of the Himalayas, Hindu Kush, and Patkai ranges define the northern frontiers of the Indian subcontinent. These were formed by the ongoing tectonic plates collision of the Indian and Eurasian plates. The mountains in these ranges include some of the world's tallest mountains which act as a barrier to cold polar winds. They also facilitate the monsoon winds which in turn influence the climate in India. Rivers originating in these mountains flow through the fertile Indo–Gangetic plains. These mountains form the boundary between two biogeographic realms: the temperate Palearctic realm that covers most of Eurasia, and the tropical and subtropical Indomalayan realm which includes South Asia, Southeast Asia and Indonesia.

The Himalayas in India extend from the Indian-administered region of Ladakh in the north to the state of Arunachal Pradesh in the east. Several Himalayan peaks in India rise above , including Kanchenjunga on the Sikkim–Nepal border, and Nanda Devi in the Garhwal Himalayas of Uttarakhand. The Himalayas act as a barrier to the frigid katabatic winds flowing down from Central Asia. Thus, northern India is kept warm or only mildly cooled during winter; in summer, the same phenomenon makes India relatively hot.

 The Karakoram range runs through Ladakh. The Siachen Glacier at  ranks as the world's second longest glacier outside the polar regions. The southern boundary of the Karakoram is formed by the Indus and Shyok rivers, which separate the range from the northwestern end of the Himalayas.

The Patkai, or Purvanchal, are situated near India's eastern border with Burma. They were created by the same tectonic processes which led to the formation of the Himalayas. The physical features of the Patkai mountains are conical peaks, steep slopes and deep valleys. The Patkai ranges are not as rugged or tall as the Himalayas. There are three hill ranges that come under the Patkai: the Patkai–Bum, the Garo–Khasi–Jaintia and the Lushai hills. The Garo–Khasi range lies in Meghalaya. Mawsynram, a village near Cherrapunji lying on the windward side of these hills, has the distinction of being the wettest place in the world, receiving the highest annual rainfall.

The Peninsular Plateau

The main features of Indian Craton are:

 Mountain ranges (clockwise from top-left)
The northern end of the range continues as isolated hills and rocky ridges into Haryana, ending near Delhi. The Aravali Range is the eroded stub of an ancient fold mountain system. The range rose in a Precambrian event called the Aravali–Delhi orogen. The range joins two of the ancient segments that make up the Indian craton, the Marwar segment to the northwest of the range, and the Bundelkhand segment to the southeast.
 Vindhya range, lies north of Satpura range and east of Aravali range, runs across most of central India, extending . They are believed to have been formed by the wastes created by the weathering of the ancient Aravali mountains. Geographically, it separates Northern India from Southern India. The western end of the range lies in eastern Gujarat, near its border with Madhya Pradesh, and runs east and north, almost meeting the Ganges at Mirzapur. 
Satpura Range, lies south of Vindhya range and east of Aravali range, begins in eastern Gujarat near the Arabian Sea coast and runs east across Maharashtra, Madhya Pradesh and Chhattisgarh. It extends  with many peaks rising above . It is triangular in shape, with its apex at Ratnapuri and the two sides being parallel to the Tapti and Narmada rivers. It runs parallel to the Vindhya Range, which lies to the north, and these two east–west ranges divide the Indo–Gangetic plain from the Deccan Plateau located north of River Narmada.
 Plateaus (clockwise from top-left)
Malwa Plateau is spread across Rajasthan, Madhya Pradesh and Gujarat. The average elevation of the Malwa plateau is 500 metres, and the landscape generally slopes towards the north. Most of the region is drained by the Chambal River and its tributaries; the western part is drained by the upper reaches of the Mahi River.
 Chhota Nagpur Plateau is situated in eastern India, covering much of Jharkhand and adjacent parts of Odisha, Bihar and Chhattisgarh. Much of the plateau is forested, covered by the Chhota Nagpur dry deciduous forests. Vast reserves of metal ores and coal have been found in the Chota Nagpur plateau. The Kathiawar peninsula in western Gujarat is bounded by the Gulf of Kutch and the Gulf of Khambat. The natural vegetation in most of the peninsula is xeric scrub, part of the Northwestern thorn scrub forests ecoregion.
 Southern Garanulite terrain: Covers South India especially Tamil Nadu excluding western and eastern ghats.
 Deccan Plateau, also called Deccan Trapps, is a large triangular plateau, bounded by the Vindhyas to the north and flanked by the Eastern and Western Ghats. The Deccan covers a total area of 1.9 million km2 (735,000-mile2). It slopes gently from west to east and gives rise to several peninsular rivers such as the Godavari, the Krishna, the Kaveri and the Mahanadi which drain into the Bay of Bengal. This region is mostly semi-arid as it lies on the leeward side of both Ghats. Much of the Deccan is covered by thorn scrub forest scattered with small regions of deciduous broadleaf forest. Climate in the Deccan ranges from hot summers to mild winters.
 Kutch Kathiawar plateau is located in Gujarat state.

 Ghats
 Western Ghats or Sahyadri mountains run along the western edge of India's Deccan Plateau and separate it from a narrow coastal plain along the Arabian Sea. Anai Mudi in the Anaimalai Hills  in Kerala is the highest peak in the Western Ghats.
 Eastern Ghats are a discontinuous range of mountains, which have been eroded and quadrisected by the four major rivers of southern India, the Godavari, Mahanadi, Krishna, and Kaveri. These mountains extend from West Bengal to Odisha, Andhra Pradesh and Tamil Nadu, along the coast and parallel to the Bay of Bengal. The Nilgiri hills in Tamil Nadu lies at the junction of the Eastern and Western Ghats. Arma Konda in Andhra Pradesh is the tallest peak in Eastern Ghats.

Indo-Gangetic plain

The Indo-Gangetic plains, also known as the Great Plains are large alluvial plains dominated by three main rivers, the Indus, Ganges, and Brahmaputra. They run parallel to the Himalayas, from Jammu and Kashmir in the west to Assam in the east, and drain most of northern and eastern India. The major rivers in this region are the Ganges, Indus, and Brahmaputra along with their main tributaries—Yamuna, Chambal, Gomti, Ghaghara, Kosi, Sutlej, Ravi, Beas, Chenab, and Tista—as well as the rivers of the Ganges Delta, such as the Meghna.

The great plains are sometimes classified into four divisions:
 The Bhabar belt is adjacent to the foothills of the Himalayas and consists of boulders and pebbles which have been carried down by streams. As the porosity of this belt is very high, the streams flow underground.
 The Tarai belt lies south of the adjacent Bhabar region and is composed of newer alluvium. The underground streams reappear in this region. The region is excessively moist and thickly forested. It also receives heavy rainfall throughout the year and is populated with a variety of wildlife.
 The Bangar belt consists of older alluvium and forms the alluvial terrace of the flood plains. In the Gangetic plains, it has a low upland covered by laterite deposits.
 The Khadar belt lies in lowland areas after the Bangar belt. It is made up of fresh newer alluvium which is deposited by the rivers flowing down the plain.

The Indo-Gangetic belt is the world's most extensive expanse of uninterrupted alluvium formed by the deposition of silt by the numerous rivers. The plains are flat making it conducive for irrigation through canals. The area is also rich in ground water sources. The plains are one of the world's most intensely farmed areas. The main crops grown are rice and wheat, which are grown in rotation. Other important crops grown in the region include maize, sugarcane and cotton. The Indo-Gangetic plains rank among the world's most densely populated areas.

Thar Desert

The Thar Desert (also known as the deserts) is by some calculations the world's seventh largest desert, by some others the tenth. The desert continues into Pakistan as the Cholistan Desert. Most of the Thar Desert is situated in Rajasthan, covering 61% of its geographic area.

About 10 percent of this region consists of sand dunes, and the remaining 90 percent consist of craggy rock forms, compacted salt-lake bottoms, and interdunal and fixed dune areas. Most of the rainfall received in this region is associated with the short July–September southwest monsoon that brings  of precipitation. Rainfall is precarious and erratic, ranging from below  in the extreme west to  eastward. The only river in this region is Luni. The soils of the arid region are generally sandy to sandy-loam in texture. The consistency and depth vary as per the topographical features. The low-lying loams are heavier may have a hard pan of clay, calcium carbonate or gypsum.

In western India, the Kutch region in Gujarat and Koyna in Maharashtra are classified as a Zone IV region (high risk) for earthquakes. The Kutch city of Bhuj was the epicentre of the 2001 Gujarat earthquake, which claimed the lives of more than 1,337 people and injured 166,836 while destroying or damaging near a million homes. The 1993 Latur earthquake in Maharashtra killed 7,928 people and injured 30,000. Other areas have a moderate to low risk of an earthquake occurring.

Coastal plains and ghats

The Eastern Coastal Plain is a wide stretch of land lying between the Eastern Ghats and the oceanic boundary of India. It stretches from Tamil Nadu in the south to West Bengal in the east. The Mahanadi, Godavari, Kaveri, and Krishna rivers drain these plains. The temperature in the coastal regions often exceeds , and is coupled with high levels of humidity. The region receives both the northeast monsoon and southwest monsoon rains. The southwest monsoon splits into two branches, the Bay of Bengal branch and the Arabian Sea branch. The Bay of Bengal branch moves northwards crossing northeast India in early June. The Arabian Sea branch moves northwards and discharges much of its rain on the windward side of Western Ghats. The plains are divided into six regions—the Mahanadi delta, the southern Andhra Pradesh plain, the Krishna-Godavari deltas, the Kanyakumari coast, the Coromandel Coast, and sandy coastal.

It extends from Gujarat in the north and extends through Maharashtra, Goa, Karnataka, and Kerala. Numerous rivers and backwaters inundate the region. Mostly originating in the Western Ghats, the rivers are fast-flowing, usually perennial, and empty into estuaries. Major rivers flowing into the sea are the Tapti, Narmada, Mandovi and Zuari. Vegetation is mostly deciduous, but the Malabar Coast moist forests constitute a unique ecoregion. The Western Coastal Plain can be divided into two parts, the Konkan and the Malabar Coast.

Islands 

The Lakshadweep and the Andaman and Nicobar Islands are India's two major island formations and are classified as union territories.

They consist of twelve atolls, three reefs, and five submerged banks, with a total of about 35 islands and islets.

The Andaman and Nicobar Islands are located between 6° and 14° north latitude and 92° and 94° east longitude. They consist of 572 islands, lying in the Bay of Bengal near the Myanmar coast running in a north–south axis for approximately 910 km. The territory consists of two island groups, the Andaman Islands and the Nicobar Islands. The Andaman and Nicobar Islands consist of 572 islands which run in a north–south axis for around 910 km. The Andaman group has 325 islands which cover an area of 6,170 km2 (2,382 sq mi) while the Nicobar group has only 247 islands with an area of 1,765 km2 (681 sq mi). India's only active volcano, Barren Island is situated here. It last erupted in 2017. The Narcondum is a dormant volcano and there is a mud volcano at Baratang. Indira Point, India's southernmost land point, is situated in the Nicobar islands at 6°45’10″N and 93°49’36″E, and lies just  from the Indonesian island of Sumatra, to the southeast.

Other significant islands in India include Diu, a former Portuguese colony; Majuli, a river island of the Brahmaputra; Elephanta in Bombay Harbour; and Sriharikota, a barrier island in Andhra Pradesh. Salsette Island is India's most populous island on which the city of Mumbai (Bombay) is located. Forty-two islands in the Gulf of Kutch constitute the Marine National Park.

Natural resources

Ecological resources

Water bodies

India has around 14,500 km of inland navigable waterways. There are twelve rivers which are classified as major rivers, with the total catchment area exceeding . All major rivers of India originate from one of the three main watersheds:
 The Himalaya and the Karakoram ranges
 Vindhya and Satpura range in central India
 Sahyadri or Western Ghats in western India

The Himalayan river networks are snow-fed and have a perennial supply throughout the year. The other two river systems are dependent on the monsoons and shrink into rivulets during the dry season. The Himalayan rivers that flow westward into Punjab are the Indus, Jhelum, Chenab, Ravi, Beas, and Sutlej.

The Ganges originates from the Gangotri Glacier in Uttarakhand. It flows southeast, draining into the Bay of Bengal. (The Yamuna and Gomti rivers also arise in the western Himalayas and join the Ganges in the plains. The Brahmaputra originates in Tibet, China, where it is known as the Yarlung Tsangpo River) (or "Tsangpo"). It enters India in the far-eastern state of Arunachal Pradesh, then flows west through Assam. The Brahmaputra merges with the Ganges in Bangladesh, where it is known as the Jamuna River.

The Chambal, another tributary of the Ganges, via the Yamuna, originates from the Vindhya-Satpura watershed. The river flows eastward. Westward-flowing rivers from this watershed are the Narmada and Tapi, which drain into the Arabian Sea in Gujarat. The river network that flows from east to west constitutes 10% of the total outflow.

(The Western Ghats are the source of all Deccan rivers, which include the through Godavari River, Krishna River and Kaveri River, all draining into the Bay of Bengal. These rivers constitute 20% of India's total outflow).

The heavy southwest monsoon rains cause the Brahmaputra and other rivers to distend their banks, often flooding surrounding areas. Though they provide rice paddy farmers with a largely dependable source of natural irrigation and fertilisation, such floods have killed thousands of people and tend to cause displacements of people in such areas.

Major gulfs include the Gulf of Cambay, Gulf of Kutch, and the Gulf of Mannar. Straits include the Palk Strait, which separates India from Sri Lanka; the Ten Degree Channel, which separates the Andamans from the Nicobar Islands; and the Eight Degree Channel, which separates the Laccadive and Amindivi Islands from the Minicoy Island to the south. Important capes include the Kanyakumari (formerly called Cape Comorin), the southern tip of mainland India; Indira Point, the southernmost point in India (on Great Nicobar Island); Rama's Bridge, and Point Calimere. The Arabian Sea lies to the west of India, the Bay of Bengal and the Indian Ocean lie to the east and south, respectively. Smaller seas include the Laccadive Sea and the Andaman Sea. There are four coral reefs in India, located in the Andaman and Nicobar Islands, the Gulf of Mannar, Lakshadweep, and the Gulf of Kutch. Important lakes include Sambhar Lake, the country's largest saltwater lake in Rajasthan, Vembanad Lake in Kerala, Kolleru Lake in Andhra Pradesh, Loktak Lake in Manipur, Dal Lake in Kashmir, Chilka Lake (lagoon lake) in Odisha, and Sasthamkotta Lake in Kerala.

Wetlands 

India's wetland ecosystem is widely distributed from the cold and arid located in the Ladakh region of Jammu and Kashmir, and those with the wet and humid climate of peninsular India. Most of the wetlands are directly or indirectly linked to river networks. The Indian government has identified a total of 71 wetlands for conservation and are part of sanctuaries and national parks. Mangrove forests are present all along the Indian coastline in sheltered estuaries, creeks, backwaters, salt marshes and mudflats. Prominent mangrove covers are located in the Andaman and Nicobar Islands, the Sundarbans delta, the Gulf of Kutch and the deltas of the Mahanadi, Godavari and Krishna rivers. Parts of Maharashtra, Karnataka and Kerala also have large mangrove covers.

The Sundarbans delta is home to the largest mangrove forest in the world. It lies at the mouth of the Ganges and spreads across areas of Bangladesh and West Bengal. The Sundarbans is a UNESCO World Heritage Site, but is identified separately as the Sundarbans (Bangladesh) and the Sundarbans National Park (India). The Sundarbans are intersected by a complex network of tidal waterways, mudflats and small islands of salt-tolerant mangrove forests. The area is known for its diverse fauna, being home to a large variety of species of birds, spotted deer, crocodiles and snakes. Its most famous inhabitant is the Bengal tiger. It is estimated that there are now 400 Bengal tigers and about 30,000 spotted deer in the area.

The Rann of Kutch is a marshy region located in northwestern Gujarat and the bordering Sindh province of Pakistan. The region was originally a part of the Arabian Sea. Geologic forces such as earthquakes resulted in the damming up of the region, turning it into a large saltwater lagoon. This area gradually filled with silt thus turning it into a seasonal salt marsh. During the monsoons, the area turn into a shallow marsh, often flooding to knee-depth. After the monsoons, the region turns dry and becomes parched.

Economic resources

Renewable water resources 
India's total renewable water resources are estimated at 1,907.8 km3 a year. Its annual supply of usable and replenshable groundwater amounts to 350 billion cubic metres. Only 35% of groundwater resources are being utilised. About 44 million tonnes of cargo is moved annually through the country's major rivers and waterways. Groundwater supplies 40% of water in India's irrigation canals. 56% of the land is arable and used for agriculture. Black soils are moisture-retentive and are preferred for dry farming and growing cotton, linseed, etc. Forest soils are used for tea and coffee plantations. Red soils have a wide diffusion of iron content.

Mineral oil
Most of India's estimated  in oil reserves are located in the Mumbai High, upper Assam, Cambay, the Krishna-Godavari and Cauvery basins. India possesses about seventeen trillion cubic feet of natural gas in Andhra Pradesh, Gujarat and Odisha. Uranium is mined in Andhra Pradesh. India has 400 medium-to-high enthalpy thermal springs for producing geothermal energy in seven "provinces"—the Himalayas, Sohana, Cambay, the Narmada-Tapti delta, the Godavari delta and the Andaman and Nicobar Islands (specifically the volcanic Barren Island.)

Minerals and ores 

India is the world's biggest producer of mica blocks and mica splittings. India ranks second amongst the world's largest producers of barite and chromite. The Pleistocene system is rich in minerals. India is the third-largest coal producer in the world and ranks fourth in the production of iron ore. It is the fifth-largest producer of bauxite, second largest of crude steel as of February 2018 replacing Japan, the seventh-largest of manganese ore and the eighth-largest of aluminium. India has significant sources of titanium ore, diamonds and limestone. India possesses 24% of the world's known and economically viable thorium, which is mined along shores of Kerala. Gold had been mined in the now-defunct Kolar Gold Fields in Karnataka.

Climate 

Based on the Köppen system, India hosts six major climatic subtypes, ranging from arid desert in the west, alpine tundra and glaciers in the north, and humid tropical regions supporting rainforests in the southwest and the island territories. The nation has four seasons: winter (January–February), summer (March–May), a monsoon (rainy) season (June–September) and a post-monsoon period (October–December).

The Himalayas act as a barrier to the frigid katabatic winds flowing down from Central Asia. Thus, northern India is kept warm or only mildly cooled during winter; in summer, the same phenomenon makes India relatively hot. Although the Tropic of Cancer—the boundary between the tropics and subtropics—passes through the middle of India, the whole country is considered to be tropical.

Summer lasts between March and June in most parts of India. Temperatures can exceed  during the day. The coastal regions exceed  coupled with high levels of humidity. In the Thar desert area temperatures can exceed . The rain-bearing monsoon clouds are attracted to the low-pressure system created by the Thar Desert. The southwest monsoon splits into two arms, the Bay of Bengal arm and the Arabian Sea arm. The Bay of Bengal arm moves northwards crossing northeast India in early June. The Arabian Sea arm moves northwards and deposits much of its rain on the windward side of Western Ghats. Winters in peninsula India see mild to warm days and cool nights. Further north the temperature is cooler. Temperatures in some parts of the Indian plains sometimes fall below freezing. Most of northern India is plagued by fog during this season.

Geology 

India's geological features are classified based on their era of formation. The Precambrian formations of Cudappah and Vindhyan systems are spread out over the eastern and southern states. A small part of this period is spread over western and central India. The Paleozoic formations from the Cambrian, Ordovician, Silurian and Devonian system are found in the Western Himalaya region in Kashmir and Himachal Pradesh. The Mesozoic Deccan Traps formation is seen over most of the northern Deccan; they are believed to be the result of sub-aerial volcanic activity. The Trap soil is black in colour and conducive to agriculture. The Carboniferous system, Permian System and Triassic systems are seen in the western Himalayas. The Jurassic system is seen in the western Himalayas and Rajasthan.

Tertiary imprints are seen in parts of Manipur, Nagaland, Arunachal Pradesh and along the Himalayan belt. The Cretaceous system is seen in central India in the Vindhyas and part of the Indo-Gangetic plains. The Gondwana system is seen in the Narmada River area in the Vindhyas and Satpuras. The Eocene system is seen in the western Himalayas and Assam. Oligocene formations are seen in Kutch and Assam. The Pleistocene system is found over central India. The Andaman and Nicobar Island are thought to have been formed in this era by volcanoes. The Himalayas were formed by the convergence and deformation of the Indo-Australian and Eurasian Plates. Their continued convergence raises the height of the Himalayas by one centimetre each year.

Soils in India can be classified into eight categories: alluvial, black, red, laterite, forest, arid and desert, saline and alkaline and peaty and organic soils. Alluvial soil constitute the largest soil group in India, constituting 80% of the total land surface. It is derived from the deposition of silt carried by rivers and are found in the Great Northern plains from Punjab to the Assam valley. Alluvial soil are generally fertile but they lack nitrogen and tend to be phosphoric. National Disaster Management Authority says that 60% of Indian landmass is prone to earthquakes and 8% susceptible to cyclone risks.

Black soil are well developed in the Deccan lava region of Maharashtra, Gujarat, and Madhya Pradesh. These contain high percentage of clay and are moisture retentive. Red soils are found in Tamil Nadu, Karnataka plateau, Andhra plateau, Chota Nagpur plateau and the Aravallis. These are deficient in nitrogen, phosphorus and humus. Laterite soils are formed in tropical regions with heavy rainfall. Heavy rainfall results in leaching out all soluble material of top layer of soil. These are generally found in Western ghats, Eastern ghats and hilly areas of northeastern states that receive heavy rainfall. Forest soils occur on the slopes of mountains and hills in Himalayas, Western Ghats and Eastern Ghats. These generally consist of large amounts of dead leaves and other organic matter called humus.

See also 

 Borders of India
 Climate change in India
 Disputed territories of India 
 List of extreme points of India
 Exclusive economic zone of India
 List of disputed territories of India 
 Outline of India 
 Category:Lists of villages in India

References

Bibliography

Further reading

 
 
 
 
 
 
 
 
 
 

 
Articles containing video clips

de:Indien#Geographie und Landesnatur